Prince is a surname. Notable people with the surname include:

A
 Alan Prince (born 1946), professor of linguistics
 Arthur Prince (disambiguation), several people
 Ashwell Prince (born 1977), South African cricketer, first non-white man to captain the South African cricket team

B
 Bevin Prince (born 1982), American actress
 Bob Prince (1916–1985), American radio and television sportscaster, and commentator

C
 Charles Prince (born 1950), American former chairman and chief executive of Citigroup
 Christian Prince (1971–1991), American Alumni of Yale
 Cushing Prince (1745–1827), American politician
 Cushing Prince Jr. (1786–1869), American sea captain

D
 Dania Prince (born 1980), Honduran regional center of Southern Honduras, and international beauty queen who has held the title of Miss Earth 2003
 Darius Prince (born 1990), American football player
 Derek Prince (1915–2003), Bible teacher whose daily radio programme reached a worldwide audience
 Derek Stephen Prince (born 1969), American voice actor
 Dawn Prince-Hughes (born 1964), anthropologist, primatologist, and ethologist

E
 Epiphanny Prince (born 1988), American professional women's basketball player
 Erik Prince (born 1969), founder and sole owner of the private military company Blackwater Worldwide
 Eric Prince (1924–2003), English retired footballer

F
 Faith Prince (born 1957), American actress and singer
 Frankie Prince (born 1949), Welsh former footballer
 F. T. Prince (1912–2003), British poet and academic

G
 Gerald Prince (born 1942), an academic and literary theoretician
 Gina Prince-Bythewood (born 1969), American film director and writer

H
 Harold Prince (1928–2019), American Broadway theatrical producer, and director

I
 Isaiah Prince (born 1997), American football player

J
 Jerome Prince (legal scholar), American attorney, academic administrator, and legal scholar
 Jerome Prince (politician), mayor of Gary, Indiana
 Jerry L. Prince, American engineer working at Johns Hopkins University
 John Prince (disambiguation), several people
 Jonathan Prince (born 1958), American actor, director, screenwriter, and movie producer
 Josh Prince (born 1988), American baseball player
 Joseph Prince, a pastor and IT consultant

K
 Karim Prince (born 1974), American actor
 Kevin-Prince Boateng (born 1987), footballer
 Kiyan Prince (1990–2006), English footballer

L
 Louis Le Prince (born 1841, vanished 1890), French inventor who shot the first moving pictures on paper film
 Louis Le Prince (composer) (died 1677), French priest and composer

M
 Mary Prince (c. 1788–after 1833), slave born in Bermuda whose autobiography was the first account of the life of a black woman to be published in the United Kingdom
 Miguel Augusto Prince (born 1957), Colombian football manager and former player
 Morton Prince (1854–1929), American physician who specialized in neurology

P
 Paperboy Prince, American artist, community activist, and politician
 Percy S. Prince (1882–1930), American college sports coach
 Peter Prince (born 1942), British novelist
 Prairie Prince (born 1950), American rock drummer

R
 R. J. Prince (born 1995), American football player
 Richard Prince (born 1949), American painter and photographer
 Robert Prince (video game composer), video games music composer
 Roland Prince, Antiguan jazz guitarist
 Rolf Prince (1928–2017) chemical engineering professor
 Ron Prince (born 1969), African-American college football coach

S
 Scott Prince (born 1980), Australian rugby league footballer
 Sedona Prince (born 2000), American women's basketball player

T
 Tayshaun Prince (born 1980), American National Basketball Association player with the Memphis Grizzlies
 Tom Prince (baseball) (born 1964), American former Major League Baseball catcher
 Tommy Prince (1915–1977), one of Canada's most decorated First Nations soldiers

Fictional characters
 Title character of the Franco-Belgian comics series Bernard Prince 
 Diana Prince, secret identity of the DC Comics character Wonder Woman
 Eileen Prince, a witch and the mother of Severus Snape in the Harry Potter book series
 Isambard Prince, main antagonist in seasons 3 and 4 of the TV series Lexx
 Martin Prince, a nerdy elementary school student in The Simpsons TV series

References

See also
 Price (surname)
 Prince
Prince (given name)
Princess
 Prinz

English-language surnames
Occupational surnames
English-language occupational surnames